Santeri Mäkinen (born 9 April 1992) is a retired Finnish football player who played for Finnish club TPS.

On 7 March 2016, he terminated his active career due to chronic knee injuries.

References

External links
 

1992 births
Living people
Finnish footballers
Turun Palloseura footballers
Veikkausliiga players
Association football midfielders